Niina Ning Zhang (born in Hohhot, Inner Mongolia, PR China) is a theoretical linguist specializing in Mandarin Chinese syntax and semantics.

Education and career 
Zhang obtained her M.A. degree in linguistics from Shanghai International Studies University, Ph.D. degrees in linguistics from Shanghai International Studies University and, in 1997, from the University of Toronto, Canada. 

In 1997-2003, she was a researcher in Zentrum für Allgemeine Sprachwissenschaft (ZAS). Now she is a professor of the Institute of Linguistics, National Chung Cheng University. She has also taught linguistic courses in Guangxi Normal University, Shanghai International Studies University, University of Toronto, and Humboldt-Universitaet zu Berlin. 

In 2009, she was awarded the Young Scholar Award from Academia Sinica, Taiwan. 

Her research specialty is formal syntax, especially the syntax of coordinate constructions. In her book Coordination in Syntax (2010 Cambridge University Press), she argues for four radical claims: (1) conjuncts are syntactically asymmetrical; (2) there is no independent syntactic category for coordinators; (3) Ross's (1967) Coordinate Structure Constraint is not a construction-specific syntactic constraint; (4) Across-The-Board Movement does not exist.

Main publications

Books and Ph.D. dissertations

 Zhang, N. 2013. Classifier Structures in Mandarin Chinese. Berlin: Mouton De Gruyter.
 Zhang, N. 2010. Coordination in Syntax. Cambridge Studies in Linguistics Series 123, Cambridge: Cambridge University Press.
 Schwabe, Kerstin and N. Zhang (eds.). 2000. Ellipsis in Conjunction. Tuebingen: Niemeyer.
 Zhang, N. 1997. Syntactic Dependencies in Mandarin Chinese. Ph.D. dissertation. University of Toronto.
 Zhang, N. 1990. Chinese Slips of the Tongue and Models of Language Production. Ph.D. dissertation. Shanghai International Studies University.

Main journal articles

 Zhang, N. 2019c. Appearance and Existence in Mandarin Chinese. Studies in Chinese Linguistics 40 (2):101–140.
 Zhang, N. 2019b. Sentence-final aspect particles as finite markers in Mandarin Chinese. Linguistics 57 (5):967–1023.
 Zhang, N. 2019a. Complex indefinites and the projection of DP in Mandarin Chinese.  Journal of East Asian Linguistics 1-32.
 Zhang, N. 2018. Non-canonical objects as event kind-classifying elements.  Natural Language & Linguistic Theory 
 Zhang, N. 2017b. The syntax of event-internal and event-external verbal classifiers.  Studia Linguistica 
 Zhang, N. 2017a. Unifying two general licensors of completive adverbials in syntax.  Linguistics 55 (2):371-411.
 Zhang, N. 2016c. Identifying Chinese dependent clauses in the forms of subjects.  Journal of East Asian Linguistics 25 (3):275-311.
 Zhang, N. 2016b. A study note on the state-denoting GE construction. Lingua Sinica 2:3.
 Zhang, N. 2016a. Understanding S-Selection. Studies in Chinese Linguistics 37 (1): 56-73.
 Zhang, N. 2015c. The Morphological Expression of Plurality and Pluractionality in Mandarin. Lingua 165: 1-27.
 Zhang, N. 2015b. Functional Head Properties of the Degree Word Hen in Mandarin Chinese. Lingua 153: 14-41.
 Zhang, N. 2015a. Nominal-internal phrasal movement in Mandarin. The Linguistic Review 32 (2): 375-425.
 Zhang, N. 2014. Expressing Number Productively in Mandarin Chinese. Linguistics 52.1: 1-34.
 Zhang, N. 2014. Summing quantities of objects at the left edge. Taiwan Journal of Linguistics.
 Zhang, N. 2013. Encoding Unexpectedness by Aspect Inflection. Concentric: Studies in Linguistics 39 (1), 23-57.
 Zhang, N. 2012. De and the Functional Expansion of Classifiers. Language and Linguistics 13 (3): 569-582.
 Zhang, N. 2012. Projecting semantic features. Studia Linguistica 66 (1): 58-74.
 Zhang, N. 2010. Explaining the immobility of conjuncts. Studia Linguistica 64 (2): 190-238.
 Zhang, N. 2009. The Syntax of Same and ATB Constructions. Canadian Journal of Linguistics 54 (2).
 Zhang, N. 2009. The Syntax of Relational-Nominal Second Constructions in Chinese. Yuyanxue Luncong 39. Peking University Press.
 Zhang, N. 2008. Gapless relative clauses as clausal licensers of relational nouns, Language and Linguistics 9 (4): 1005-1028.
 Zhang, N. 2008. Existential Coda Constructions as Internally Headed Relative Clause Constructions. The Linguistics Journal 3 (3): 8-57.
 Zhang, N. 2008. Repetitive and Correlative Coordinators as Focus Particles Parasitic on Coordinators. SKY Journal of Linguistics. Vol. 21: 295-342.
 Zhang, N. 2008. Relativized Parallelism in Mandarin Chinese Natural Coordination. Language Research 44 (1): 121-163.
 Zhang, N. 2007. Universal 20 and Taiwan Sign Language. Sign Language and Linguistics 10 (1): 55-81.
 Zhang, N. 2007. The Syntactic Derivations of Two Paired Dependency Constructions. Lingua 117 (12): 2134-2158.
 Zhang, N. 2007. On the Categorial Issue of Coordination. Lingua et Linguistica 1 (1): 7-45.
 Zhang, N. 2007. The Syntactic Derivations of Split Antecedent Relative Clause Constructions. Taiwan Journal of Linguistics 5 (1): 19-47.
 Zhang, N. 2007. Root merger in Chinese compounds. Studia Linguistica 61 (2): 170-184.
 Zhang, N. 2007. A syntactic account of the Direct Object Restriction in Chinese. Language Research 43 (1): 53-75.
 Zhang, N. 2007. The Syntax of English Comitative Constructions. Folia Linguistica 41: 135-169.
 Lin, Jo-wang & Zhang, N. 2006. The Syntax of the Non-Referential TA 『it' in Mandarin Chinese. Language and Linguistics 7 (4): 991-1016.
 Zhang, N. 2006. On the Configuration Issue of Coordination. Language and Linguistics 7 (1): 175-223.
 Zhang, N. 2006. Representing Specificity by the Internal Order of Indefinites. Linguistics 44 (1): 1-21.
 Zhang, N. 2004. Against Across-The-Board Movement. Concentric: Studies in Linguistics 30: 123-156.
 Zhang, N. 2004. Move is Remerge. Language and Linguistics 5 (1): 189-209.
 Zhang, N. 2000. Object Shift in Mandarin Chinese. Journal of Chinese Linguistics 28 (2): 201-246.
 Zhang, N. 1999. Chinese de and the de-construction. Syntaxis 2: 27-49.
 Zhang, N. 1998. The Interactions Between Lexical Meanings and Construction Meanings. Linguistics 36 (5): 957-980.
 Zhang, N. 1998. Argument Interpretations of the Ditransitive Construction. Nordic Journal of Linguistics 21: 179-209.
 Zhang, N. 1997. The Avoidance of the Third Tone Sandhi in Mandarin Chinese, Journal of East Asian Linguistics 6: 293-338.

Main book chapter articles

 Zhang, N. 2017b. Verbal classifiers. In R. Sybesma, W. Behr, Y. Gu, Z. Handel, C.-T. J. Huang, & J. Myers (eds.), Encyclopedia of Chinese Language and Linguistics. Leiden: Brill. Vol. 1: 627-631.
 Zhang, N. 2017a. Adpositions. In R. Sybesma, W. Behr, Y. Gu, Z. Handel, C.-T. J. Huang, & J. Myers (eds.), Encyclopedia of Chinese Language and Linguistics. Leiden: Brill. Vol. 1: 116-122.
 Zhang, N. 2012. Countability and numeral classifiers in Mandarin Chinese. In Diane Massam (ed.), Count and Mass Across Languages.  Oxford: Oxford University Press: 220-237.
 Zhang, N. 2009. The Syntax of Relational-Nominal Second Constructions in Chinese. Yuyanxue Luncong 39: 257-301. Peking University Press.
 Zhang, N. 2003. On the Pre-Predicate Lai [come] and Qu [go] in Chinese. In Jie Xu, Donghng Ji, and Kim Teng Lua (eds.), Chinese Syntax and Semantics: Language Science and Technology Monograph Series, Vol. 1. Singapore: Prentice Hall, pp. 177–201.
 Zhang, N. 2002. The asymmetry between depictives and resultatives in Chinese. In Anna Maria Di Sciullo (ed.), Asymmetry in Grammar. Amsterdam: John Benjamins, pp. 165–185.
 Zhang, N. 2002. Movement within a Spatial Phrase. In: Hubert Cuyckens and Guenter Radden (eds.), Perspectives on Prepositions. Linguistische Arbeiten. Band 454. Tuebingen: Max Niemeyer, pp. 47–63.
 Zhang, N. 2001. [Q] Checking in Mandarin Chinese Yes-No Questions. In: G. Alexandrova & O. Arnaudova (eds.) The Minimalist Parameter, Amsterdam: John Benjamins pp. 261–278.
 Zhang, N. 2001. Predicate raising in the Chinese secondary predication. In: N. Dehe & A. Wittek (eds.) Structural aspects of semantically complex verbs. Frankfurt am Main: Peter Lang Verlag, pp. 293–323.
 Zhang, N. 1997. A Binding Approach to Eventuality Quantification in Dou Constructions, in Liejiong Xu (ed.) Referential Properties of Chinese Noun Phrases. Paris: Ecole des Hautes en Sciences Sociales, Centre de Recherches Linguistiques sur l'Asie Orientale, pp. 167–207.

References 

Linguists from China
Living people
Educators from Inner Mongolia
People from Hohhot
Academic staff of Guangxi Normal University
Academic staff of Shanghai International Studies University
Academic staff of the University of Toronto
Academic staff of the Humboldt University of Berlin
Academic staff of the National Chung Cheng University
Writers from Inner Mongolia
Scientists from Inner Mongolia
Women linguists
Year of birth missing (living people)